Laetitia Valdonado (born 4 August 1977 in Pau) is a retired French athlete who specialised in the 800 metres. She won the gold medal at the 2005 Mediterranean Games.

Competition record

Personal bests
Outdoor
800 metres – 1:59.35 (Heusden-Zolder 2004)
1500 metres – 4:26.04 (Montgeron 2002)
Indoor
800 metres – 2:02.58 (Ghent 2005)
1000 metres – 2:41.36 (Liévin 2005)
1500 metres – 4:25.45 (Liévin 2002)

National Championships 
French Outdoor Athletic Championships :
winner of 800 m  2000 
French Indoor Athletic Championships :
winner of 800 m in 2001, 2004, 2005 and 2006

References
 Biography of Laetitia Valdonado on the site o f the Fédération française d'athlétisme

1977 births
Living people
French female middle-distance runners
Sportspeople from Pau, Pyrénées-Atlantiques
Mediterranean Games gold medalists for France
Mediterranean Games silver medalists for France
Mediterranean Games medalists in athletics
Athletes (track and field) at the 2005 Mediterranean Games
20th-century French women